SIMEC Group Ltd is a British international energy and natural resources business focused on resources, sustainable power, infrastructure, and commodities trading. In 2016 it had an annual turnover of almost USD2.5 billion and net assets of USD350 million. It is part of the Gupta Family Group ("GFG") Alliance, owned by members of the Gupta family, which had a combined turnover of more than USD13 billion and combined net assets of more than USD2.3 billion. Its activities span renewable energy generation, mining, shipping, and commodities trading. 

The group was founded in 1996 by Parduman K. Gupta, whose son, Sanjeev Gupta, had established Liberty House Group in 1992. Both SIMEC Group and Liberty House Group are independent companies within the GFG Alliance, of which Sanjeev Gupta became executive chairman.

SIMEC Group in Australia
In 2013, SIMEC Group refocused itself – mainly on to sustainable power, mining and infrastructure. Among many developments since then, in 2017 it acquired Arrium Mining and OneSteel operations in South Australia for USD750 million. The mining assets of the former company included iron ore (magnetite and haematite) mines in the Middleback Range and a dolomite mine (to supply blast furnace flux) at Ardrossan, South Australia.

In 2017, GFG Alliance purchased Arrium's Whyalla Steelworks in South Australia, announcing that a new AUD600 million investment would lift production to 1.8 million tonnes a year. In 2018 the company announced it would build a new steel manufacturing plant next to the existing one. It would be capable of producing 10 million tonnes a year – making it the largest in the western world – and have infrastructure to eventually double that capacity.

SIMEC Mining acquired mining leases in 2018 for the Iron Sultan and Iron Warrior mines in the Middleback Range, 50 km (30 mi) south-west of Whyalla, reflecting the need for significant sources of iron ore for its expanding capacity.

Another member of GFG Alliance, SIMEC Energy Australia Pty Ltd, acquired a controlling stake in South Australian  renewable energy and storage technologies company, ZEN Energy Pty Ltd, in 2017 and formed a joint venture named SIMEC Zen Energy. Sanjeev Gupta said his company was investing in large-scale power projects to meet its own industrial requirements. Describing the high cost of energy for Australian consumers as "a crying shame for a country so rich in resources", he said "it has been a priority for us to take decisive remedial steps."

References

Energy companies of the United Kingdom
Energy companies established in 1996
1996 establishments in England